Shree Narayan Singh is an Indian film director and editor, known for films such as Toilet: Ek Prem Katha (2017), Batti Gul Meter Chalu (2018) and Yeh Jo Mohabbat Hai (2012).

Career
Singh was born in Balrampur, UP. Before venturing into film direction, Singh worked as a film editor in films like A Wednesday (2008), Special 26 (2013), M.S. Dhoni: The Untold Story (2016) and Rustom (2016). He started his career as an editor for Don Muthu Swami and as a director in Yeh Jo Mohabbat Hai.

His second directorial was Toilet: Ek Prem Katha and it starred Akshay Kumar and Bhumi Pednekar. The film was produced by Ajit Andhare and Prernaa Arora, under the banner of Viacom 18 Motion Pictures and KriArj Entertainment. Made on a budget of  750 million, the film grossed  1.68 billion in domestic areas and  2 billion in the worldwide areas. Singh was nominated for Filmfare awards under the best director category for the film Toilet: Ek Prem Katha.

In February 2018, it was announced that Singh would be directing Batti Gul Meter Chalu which stars Shahid Kapoor, Shraddha Kapoor and Yami Gautam in lead roles and is produced by Bhushan Kumar and Krishan Kumar under T-Series and Prernaa Arora under KriArj Entertainment.

Filmography

References

1981 births
Living people
Film directors from Mumbai
Hindi film editors
Hindi-language film directors
Film editors from Maharashtra